Coimbatore is a Lok Sabha constituency  in western Tamil Nadu, India. Its Tamil Nadu Parliamentary Constituency number is 20 of 39. It is the largest city of the Western region of Tamil Nadu and the district headquarters of the Coimbatore district.

Assembly segments
Coimbatore Lok Sabha constituency is composed of the following assembly segments:  

Before delimitation in 2009, it consisted of the following constituencies: Singanallur, Coimbatore West, Coimbatore East, Perur, Palladam and Tiruppur.

Members of the Parliament

Election results

General Election 2019

General Election 2014

General Election 2009

General Election 2004

General Election, 1999

General Election 1998

See also 
 Coimbatore
 Coimbatore East (state assembly constituency)
 List of Constituencies of the Lok Sabha

References

 http://164.100.24.209/newls/lokaralpha.aspx?lsno=13

External links
Coimbatore lok sabha  constituency election 2019 date and schedule

Lok Sabha constituencies in Tamil Nadu
Government of Coimbatore